Access was a British credit card brand launched by Lloyds Bank, Midland Bank and National Westminster Bank in 1972 to rival the already established Barclaycard. It became defunct in 1996, when it was taken over by MasterCard.

History
The Access card was introduced in the United Kingdom by a consortium consisting of National Westminster Bank, Midland Bank (now HSBC UK) and Lloyds Bank, later joined by Williams & Glyn's Bank (now RBS) as a rival to the established Barclaycard. It was established as a joint venture incorporated as The Joint Credit Card Company Limited with Lloyds, Midland and National Westminster banks each owning 30% and Williams & Glyn's owning 10%. The Access name was registered as a trademark on 26 November 1971 and the product was launched on 23 October 1972.

In Scotland, the card was issued by Williams & Glyn's sister company, the Royal Bank of Scotland and by Clydesdale Bank, then a subsidiary of Midland Bank.

In Northern Ireland and the Republic of Ireland, it was issued by Ulster Bank, a subsidiary of NatWest and by Northern Bank, at the time a subsidiary of Midland.

The scheme participated in the Eurocard/MasterCard systems. Europay International has since been taken over by MasterCard International.

The business was run from several offices in Southend-on-Sea in Essex. The main site, at Priory Crescent, was subsequently sold on to the Royal Bank of Scotland, before being demolished to make way for a housing development.

Cultural impact
From 1978, the main slogan of Access was "Your Flexible Friend", which featured in many television advertisements, accompanied by an animated Access and his friend Money (a pound sign). Earlier advertisements featured the bumbling "Fat Wallet". A take on the slogan ("My flexible friend") was featured in the third episode of Mr. Bean, when the title character refers to his own credit card.

Another slogan which featured in a television advertisement was "Does you does, or does you don't take Access?" (sung to the tune of "Is You Is or Is You Ain't My Baby"). Yet another slogan was "It takes the waiting out of wanting". Access was shirt sponsor of Southend United Football Club in the beginning of 1980s.

References

External links

History of Plastic Cards The UK Cards Association
The History of the Access Credit Card AccessCreditCard.info

Financial services companies established in 1972
1972 establishments in the United Kingdom
Products introduced in 1972
Companies based in Essex
Credit cards
HSBC
Lloyds Banking Group
NatWest Group
Southend-on-Sea (town)
Buildings and structures in Southend-on-Sea